The Church of St. Casimir is a Roman Catholic church in Vilnius' Old Town, close to the Vilnius' Town Hall. It is the first and the oldest baroque church in Vilnius, built in 1618.

The construction of the church began in 1604 in memory of the holy prince Saint Casimir. It was built by the Jesuits with funding by the Great Chancellor of the Grand Duchy of Lithuania Lew Sapieha, Voivode of Vilnius Mikołaj Krzysztof "the Orphan" Radziwiłł, and other nobles. It is traditionally assumed that the corner stone (which can be seen on the façade wall) was pulled into the city by procession of 700 Vilniusites from the Antakalnis hills. The construction was finished in 1616, and the interior design completed in 1618.

The Church of St. Casimir is one of the earliest exemplary Baroque buildings in the city. Its spatial composition and facade were designed along the line of the famous Il Gesù church in Rome. The shape of the building was modeled after the churches in Kraków and Lublin, with additional towers. The author of the design was Jan Frankiewicz, a pupil of architect Giovanni Maria Bernardoni.

In the middle of the 18th century the church was reconstructed by architect Thomas Zebrowski. Under his supervision a stepped lantern cupola with a crown was erected. This large and impressive cupola is unique in the entire region of the former Grand Duchy of Lithuania. Under Russia's occupation the church of St. Casimir was converted into a Russian Orthodox church. In 1915 Vilnius was occupied by the Germans and the church was converted into the Evangelical Lutheran prayer house of the Vilnius Garrison. In 1919 the church of St. Casimir was returned to the Catholics, but was damaged again during the Second World War, closed down and in 1963 converted into a Museum of Atheism. The church was reconsecrated in 1991.

The church is known for excellent acoustics and organ concerts with renowned international musicians.

Gallery

See also
 List of Jesuit sites

References

Bibliography

Roman Catholic churches completed in 1618
17th-century Roman Catholic church buildings in Lithuania
Baroque architecture in Lithuania
Church buildings with domes
Roman Catholic churches in Vilnius
1618 establishments in the Polish–Lithuanian Commonwealth